The Mount Sinai School  is an English medium school located in Ramnagar, Uttarakhand, India.

Overview
Mount Sinai Schoo was founded by P. K. Benjamin and his wife Shashi Benjamin on 1 August 1994. It is run and managed by the Christian Community. The school is affiliated to the Council for the Indian School Certificate Examinations, New Delhi. The school is run under the management of the Mount Sinai School Society, registered under the Societies Registration Act XXI of 1860.

References

Christian schools in Uttarakhand
High schools and secondary schools in Uttarakhand
Education in Nainital district
Educational institutions established in 1994
1994 establishments in Uttar Pradesh